Noorda trimaculalis is a moth in the family Crambidae. It was described by Hans Georg Amsel in 1965. It is found in Ethiopia.

References

Moths described in 1965
Crambidae